Tiberius III, born Apsimar, was Byzantine emperor from 698 to 705AD. In 696, Tiberius was part of an army sent by Byzantine Emperor Leontius to retake the city of Carthage in the Exarchate of Africa, which had been captured by the Arab Umayyads. After seizing the city, this army was pushed back by Umayyad reinforcements and retreated to the island of Crete; some of the officers, fearing the wrath of Leontius, killed their commander, and declared Tiberius emperor. Tiberius swiftly gathered a fleet, sailed for Constantinople, and deposed Leontius. Tiberius did not attempt to retake Byzantine Africa from the Umayyads, but campaigned against them along the eastern border with some success. In 705 former emperor Justinian II, who had been deposed by Leontius, led an army of Slavs and Bulgars from the First Bulgarian Empire to Constantinople, and after entering the city secretly, deposed Tiberius. Tiberius fled to Bithynia, but was captured a few months later and beheaded between August 705 and February 706. His body was initially thrown into the sea, but was later recovered and buried in a church on the island of Prote.

History

Early life
Very little is known of Tiberius before the reign of Byzantine emperor Leontius, except for his birth name, Apsimar, historically considered to be of Germanic origin. The historian Wolfram Brandes traces the traditional assumption of a Germanic origin to J. B. Bury, but remarks that it is incorrect. The Byzantinists Anthony Bryer and Judith Herrin have suggested that the name Apsimar may be Slavic in origin, and scholars Leslie Brubaker and John Haldon have suggested a Turkic origin. Some scholars, such as Alexander Vasiliev, have speculated that Tiberius was of Gotho-Greek origin. The Byzantinist Walter Kaegi states that Tiberius had some unspecified victories over the Slavs in the Balkans during his early military career, which granted him a degree of popularity.

Background
In 696, the Umayyad Caliphate renewed their attack upon the Exarchate of Africa of the Byzantine Empire, seizing the city of Carthage in 697. The Byzantine Emperor Leontius sent John the Patrician with an army to retake the city, which John accomplished after launching a surprise attack on its harbor. Despite this initial success, the city was swiftly retaken by Umayyad reinforcements, which forced John to retreat to the island of Crete to regroup. A group of officers who feared Leontiuss wrath for failing to recapture Carthage killed John, and declared Apsimar as emperor. Apsimar took the regnal name Tiberius; during this period, the selection of a regnal name was quite common, but later fell out of favor. Tiberius gathered a fleet and allied himself with the Greens (one of the Hippodrome factions), before sailing for Constantinople, which was enduring an outbreak of the bubonic plague. Tiberius and his troops landed at the port of Sykai on the Golden Horn, and then proceeded to lay siege to the city. After several months, the gates of Constantinople were opened for Tiberiuss forces by members of the Green faction, allowing Tiberius to seize the city and depose Leontius; however, this did not prevent his troops from plundering the city. Tiberius had Leontiuss nose slit, and sent him to live in the Monastery of Psamathion in Constantinople. According to the 12th-century chronicler Michael the Syrian, himself citing an unnamed contemporary Syriac source, Tiberius justified his coup by pointing to Leontius' own dethroning of Emperor Justinian II for mismanaging the empire as precedent. Tiberius was the first naval officer to assume the throne, partly because Byzantines considered the army far more prestigious.

Rule

Tiberius was crowned by Patriarch Callinicus shortly after seizing control of Constantinople and deposing Leontius. Once in power, Tiberius did not attempt to retake Byzantine Africa from the Umayyads but rather focused his attention upon the eastern border of his empire. Heraclius invaded the Umayyad Caliphate in late autumn of 698, crossing the mountain passes of the Taurus Mountains into Cilicia before marching for northern Syria. Heraclius defeated an Arab army sent from Antioch, then raided as far as Samosata before pulling back to the safety of Byzantine lands in spring of 699.

Heraclius' military successes led to a series of punitive Arab attacks, with the Umayyad generals Muhammad ibn Marwan and Abdallah ibn Abd al-Malik launching a string of campaigns that conquered the remainder of Byzantine Armenia, which Heraclius was unable to effectively respond to. The Armenians launched a large revolt against the Umayyads in 702, requesting Byzantine aid. al-Malik launched a campaign to reconquer Armenia in 704 but was attacked by Heraclius in Cilicia. Heraclius defeated the Arab army of 10,000–12,000 men led by Yazid ibn Hunayn at Sisium, killing most and enslaving the rest; in spite of this, Heraclius was not able to stop al-Malik from reconquering Armenia.

Tiberius attempted to strengthen the Byzantine military by reorganizing its structure, as well as reorganizing the Cibyrrhaeotic Theme, and repairing the sea walls of Constantinople. Tiberius also focused his attention on the island of Cyprus, which had been underpopulated since many of the inhabitants were moved to the region of Cyzicus under Justinian II: Tiberius successfully negotiated with Abd al-Malik in 698/699 to allow the Cypriots who had been moved to Cyzicus, and those who had been captured by the Arabs and brought to Syria, to return to their homelands. He also strengthened the garrison of the island with Mardaite troops from the Taurus Mountains. According to the historian Warren Treadgold, Tiberius attempted to contain the Arabs at sea by way of creating new military provinces, with the creation of the Theme of Sardinia and separating the Theme of Sicily from the Exarchate of Ravenna.

In 702, Justinian II escaped from the theme of Cherson and gained the support of Khagan Busir, leader of the Khazars, who gave Justinian II his sister Theodora as a bride, and welcomed him to his court in Phanagoria. By 703, reports that Justinian II was attempting to gain support to retake the throne reached Tiberius, who swiftly sent envoys to the Khazars demanding that Justinian II be handed over to the Byzantines, dead or alive. Justinian II eluded capture, and sought the support of the khan of the First Bulgarian Empire, Tervel. In 705, Justinian II led an army of Slavs and Bulgars to Constantinople and laid siege to it for three days before scouts discovered an old and disused conduit that ran under the walls of the city. Justinian II and a small detachment of soldiers used this route to gain access to the city, exited at the northern edge of the wall near the Palace of Blachernae, and quickly seized the building. Tiberius fled to the city of Sozopolis in Bithynia, and eluded his pursuers for several months before being captured. The exact timing of Justinian IIs siege and Tiberius capture is convoluted. According to the numismatist Philip Grierson, Justinian II entered the city on 21 August, but according to Byzantist Constance Head, Justinian II seized the city on 10 July, and the 21 August date is instead the date where Tiberius was captured in Sozopolis, or else the date when he was transported back to Constantinople. Six months later, probably on 15 February, Justinian II had both Leontius and Tiberius dragged to the Hippodrome and publicly humiliated, before being taken away to the Kynegion and beheaded. Their bodies were initially thrown into the sea, but were later recovered and buried in a church on the island of Prote.

Legacy
Constance Head comments that although little is known of Tiberius, the evidence points to him being a "conscientious and effective ruler", and states that he might be remembered as "one of the truly great emperors of Byzantium" if he had reigned longer. Kaegi states that succeeding dynasties of the Byzantine Empire, and their associated historians, tend to blame the permanent loss of Byzantine Africa upon Tiberius, although he remarks that, by the time Tiberius took the throne, it was far too late for the Byzantines to restore their control.

Family
Tiberius had a son, Theodosius, who became bishop of Ephesus by 729, presided over the Council of Hieria in 754, and was a confidant of Emperors Leo III and Constantine V. Byzantine historian Graham Sumner has suggested that this may instead be later Emperor Theodosius III. Sumner presents the evidence that both figures held the Bishopric of Ephesus at similar times: Emperor Theodosius became bishop after 716, according to the Chronicon Altinate, and Theodosius the son of Tiberius became bishop by 729, suggesting they may be the same person. Byzantine historians Cyril Mango and Roger Scott do not view this theory as likely, as it would mean that Emperor Theodosius had to have lived for thirty more years after his abdication. The period that Tiberius ruled in, the Twenty Years' Anarchy, was so fraught with strife that it is common that not even the names of the emperors' spouses have been retained.

References

Notes

Citations

Bibliography

 
 
 
 

7th-century Byzantine emperors
8th-century Byzantine emperors
Byzantine admirals
7th-century births
706 deaths
Twenty Years' Anarchy
690s in the Byzantine Empire
700s in the Byzantine Empire
Executed monarchs
People executed by decapitation